The 1992 Grand Prix Hassan II was an Association of Tennis Professionals men's tennis tournament held in Casablanca, Morocco and played on outdoor clay courts. It was part of the World Series of the 1992 ATP Tour. It was the 8th edition of the tournament and was held from 16 March until 23 March 1992. Second-seeded Guillermo Pérez Roldán won the singles title.

Finals

Singles

 Guillermo Pérez Roldán defeated  Germán López 2–6, 7–5, 6–3
 It was Pérez-Roldán's only title of the year and the eighth of his career.

Doubles

 Horacio de la Peña /  Jorge Lozano defeated  Ģirts Dzelde /  T. J. Middleton 2–6, 6–4, 7–6
 It was de la Peña's first title of the year and the seventh of his career. It was Lozano's only title of the year and the eighth of his career.

References

External links 
 ATP tournament profile

 
Grand Prix Hassan II
Grand Prix Hassan II